Portrait of a Family or the Brunswick Family Portrait is a 1668 oil on canvas painting by Rembrandt, now in the Herzog Anton Ulrich-Museum in Braunschweig. Its subjects are unidentified.

Bibliography 
 Christel Brückner: Rembrandts Braunschweiger Familienbild. Olms, Hildesheim 1998,  
 Silke Gatenbröcker: Familienglück – Rembrandt und sein Braunschweiger Meisterwerk. Imhof, Petersberg 2006,  
 Doris Guth, Elisabeth Priedl (Hrsg.): Bilder der Liebe: Liebe, Begehren und Geschlechterverhältnisse in der Kunst der Frühen Neuzeit. Transcript Verlag, Bielefeld 2014, S. 139–146,  
 Rembrandt und sein Kreis. Bilderhefte des Herzog-Anton-Ulrich-Museums; H. 4. Herzog Anton Ulrich-Museum, Braunschweig 1973

External links 
  Familienglück - Rembrandt und sein Braunschweiger Meisterwerk. Zur Sonderausstellung im Herzog Anton Ulrich-Museum 24 September to 17 December 2006, retrieved 2 April 2017.
  Familienbild auf Kulturerbe Niedersachsen

References 

Group portraits by Dutch artists
Paintings by Rembrandt
1668 paintings
17th-century portraits
Paintings in the collection of the Herzog Anton Ulrich Museum